Castle Ring is an Iron Age hill fort, situated high up on the southern edge of Cannock Chase (The Chase), Staffordshire, England.

It is the highest point on The Chase with an elevation of 242 metres (794 feet).

It is near the village of Cannock Wood, south of Rugeley and north of Burntwood, adjacent to the Heart of England Way. There are excellent views over The Chase, the Trent Valley and Staffordshire more generally.

The public are free to walk around it as there is a path.

History
Castle Ring is thought to have first been occupied around 50 (CE), by an Ancient British (Celtic) tribe named the Cornovii.

Apart from perimeter earthworks, little remains visible. Parts of the ground in the ring appear to have been ploughed, but there is no consensus as to whether this was carried out in prehistoric times, or in the medieval period, when a hunting lodge was also built in the ring. The remains of this lodge are still visible.

External links

 Ancient Britain - Castle Ring
 District Council Web Site
 Web site of Heart of England Way Association
 roman-britain.org page
 From 'The Megalith Map'

See also
List of hill forts in England
List of hill forts in Scotland
List of hill forts in Wales

Hill forts in Staffordshire
Tourist attractions in Staffordshire
Hills of Staffordshire
Cannock Chase